I Myself and Me is a 1992 studio album released by Swedish singer Pernilla Wahlgren. "C'est Demon!", "Fallen Angel", "All of Me" and "Are You Ready" were released as singles.

Track listing 

 Starshine
 C'est démon!
 Give a Little Love (Norell Oson Bard)
 Fallen Angel (A. Wollbeck, Alexander Bard, El-Hag)
 We Could Make It Happen (E. Ingrosso, A. Wollbeck, Alexander Bard)
 Are You Ready (Norell Oson Bard)
 Rise
 I Myself and Me (A. Wollbeck, Alexander Bard, Jean-Pierre Barda)
 Love of Jealousy
 When
 No. 1 Priority (D. Carr)
 All of Me

Pernilla Wahlgren albums
1992 albums